Alcántara is an underground metro station on the Line 1 of the Santiago Metro, in Santiago, Chile. The station was opened on 22 August 1980 as part of the extension of the line from Salvador to Escuela Militar.

References

Santiago Metro stations
Railway stations opened in 1980
1980 establishments in Chile
Santiago Metro Line 1